Trick or treat or trick-or-treating is a Halloween activity.

Trick or Treat may also refer to:

Film 
 Trick or Treat (1952 film), a Disney cartoon short featuring Donald Duck
 Trick or Treat (unfinished film), a film by Michael Apted begun in 1975
 Trick or Treats, a 1982 horror film
 Trick or Treat (1986 film), a horror film directed by Charles Martin Smith
 Trick 'r Treat, a 2007 horror film directed by Michael Dougherty

Music 
 Trick or Treat (band), an Italian power metal music group
 Trick or Treat (Fastway album), 1987, the soundtrack from the 1986 film
 Trick or Treat (Paul Brady album), 1991
 "Trick or Treat", a song by Diamond Head from Four Cuts
 "Trick or Treat", a song by Robert Cray from Sweet Potato Pie
 "Trick or Treat", a song by Peaches from I Feel Cream

Television 
 Trick or Treat (TV series), a British series featuring Derren Brown

Episodes 
 "Trick or Treat" (The Beverly Hillbillies)
 "Trick or Treat" (Bewitched)
 "Trick or Treat" (Boston Legal)
 "Trick or Treat" (Charles in Charge)
 "Trick or Treat" (Clueless)
 "Trick or Treat" (Curb Your Enthusiasm)
 "Trick or Treat" (Cyberchase)
 "Trick or Treat" (Gotham Girls)
 "Trick or Treat" (Holby City)
 "Trick or Treat" (Monster Warriors)
 "Trick or Treat" (The New Worst Witch)
 "Trick or Treat" (Roseanne)
 "Trick or Treat" (Mighty Morphin Power Rangers)
 "Trick or Treat" (Tales from the Darkside)
 "Trick or Treat" (Teen Mom)
 "Trick or Treat" (Where on Earth Is Carmen Sandiego?)